These are the international rankings of the Czech Republic.

International rankings 
 Democracy Index 2017: Ranks 34th of 167 countries
 Global Competitiveness Report 2011-12: Ranks 38th out of 142 countries
 Global Peace Index May 2018: Ranks 7th out of 163 countries
 Human Development Index 2016: Ranks 28th out of 188 countries
 Index of Economic Freedom 2018: Ranks 24th out of 180 countries
 Reporters Without Borders worldwide Press Freedom Index 2018: Ranks 34th out of 180 countries
 World Economic Forum Travel & Tourism Competitiveness Report: 39th.
 Education - "Science performance" Index 2009: High positions in rankings

References

Czech Republic